The History of the Psychoanalytic Movement is a 1914 work by Sigmund Freud, the founder of psychoanalysis.

Content 
Freud's work is intended primarily as a polemic against the competing theories in psychotherapy which opposed his psychoanalysis, for example Alfred Adler's individual psychology and Carl Jung's analytical psychology. Adler and Jung had previously been followers of Freud but objected to his emphasis on sexual matters. His main criticism of them is their insistence on still calling themselves psychoanalysts.

References

External links

1914 non-fiction books
Books by Sigmund Freud